Blue Sea Lake (Outaouais Aviation) Water Aerodrome  is located on Blue Sea Lake, Quebec, Canada.

References

Registered aerodromes in Outaouais
Seaplane bases in Quebec